Al-Hakam II, also known as Abū al-ʿĀṣ al-Mustanṣir bi-Llāh al-Hakam b. ʿAbd al-Raḥmān (January 13, 915 – October 16, 976), was the Caliph of Córdoba. He was the second Umayyad Caliph of Córdoba in Al-Andalus, and son of Abd-al-Rahman III and Murjan. He ruled from 961 to 976.

Early rule

Al-Hakam II succeeded to the Caliphate after the death of his father Abd-ar-Rahman III in 961. He secured peace with the Catholic kingdoms of northern Iberia, and made use of the stability to develop agriculture through the construction of irrigation works. Economic development was also encouraged through the widening of streets and the building of markets.

Patron of Knowledge
Hakam himself was very well versed in numerous sciences. He would have books purchased from Damascus, Baghdad, Constantinople, Cairo, Mecca, Medina, Kufa, and Basra. His status as a patron of knowledge brought him fame across the Muslim world to the point that even books written in Persia, which was under Arab Abbasid control, were dedicated to him. During his reign, a massive translation effort was undertaken, and many books were translated from Latin and Greek into Arabic. He formed a joint committee of Muwallad Muslims and Mozarab Catholics for this task.

His personal library was of enormous proportions. Some accounts speak of him having more than 600,000 books. The catalogue of library books itself was claimed to be 44 volumes long. Of special importance to Al-Hakam was history, and he himself wrote a history of al-Andalus. Following his death, Hajib Almanzor had all "ancient science" books destroyed.

The mathematician Lubna of Córdoba was employed as Al-Hakam's private secretary. She was said to be "thoroughly versed in the exact sciences; her talents were equal to the solution of the most complex geometrical and algebraic problems".

The famous physician, scientist, and surgeon Abu al-Qasim al-Zahrawi (Abulcasis) was also active in Al-Hakam's court during his reign, while the leading figures of the Translation movement during the reign of Hakam were Mutazilites and Ibn Masarra.

Construction projects

His building works included an expansion of the main mosque of Córdoba (962–966), the Mezquita, and the completion of the royal residence Medina Azahara (976), which his father had begun in 936.

Military conflict in North Africa
Whilst the internal administration was left increasingly to vizir Al-Mushafi, general Ghālib ibn ʿAbd al-Raḥmān was gradually gaining influence as leader of the army in North Africa. He was chiefly preoccupied with repulsing the last Norman attacks (c. 970), and with the struggle against the Zirids and the Fatimids in northern Morocco. The Fatimids were defeated in Morocco in 974, while Al-Hakam II was able to maintain the supremacy of the caliphate over the Catholic states of Navarre, Castile and León.

Personal life
Al-Hakam married Subh of Cordoba, a Basque concubine. She held sway and strong influence over the court. It is said that al-Hakam nicknamed her with the masculine name Ja'far. She bore him two sons, the first is Abd al-Rahman (962–970), who died young, and the second is Hisham II (966–1013).

Possible homosexuality
According to É. Lévi-Provençal, the phrase Ḥubb al-walad, as found in al-Maqqari's Nafḥ al-ṭayyib, is a reference to al-Hakam's homosexuality or "preference for boys". However, several historians render it as "paternal love", referring instead to him choosing his young son as a successor. The fact that he did not produce a suitable heir before the age of 46 has been ascribed either to him being more attracted to men,—although this is only reported euphemistically in the sources,—or because he was too absorbed with his books to care for sensual pleasures. Subh may have dressed as a ghulam or a young man to make herself more attractive to al-Hakam (adopting a short haircut and wearing trousers), although it is also possible she did this in order to gain better access to the male-dominated royal court.

Death and succession
Al-Hakam II suffered a stroke near the end of his life that curtailed his activities and may explain why he was unable to properly prepare his son for leadership. Modern scholars have speculated that, based on the historical descriptions of his death, it was another cerebrovascular stroke, possibly brought on by the cold weather, that claimed his life in October 976.  He was succeeded by his son, Hisham II al-Mu'ayad, who was 11 years old at the time and during his minority under regency by General Ghalib al-Nasiri, al-Mushafi, chief administrator of the late caliph, and Subh, his mother, assisted by her secretary Almanzor.

See also

Moors
Islam in Spain

References

External links

Arabic biography
Stirnet: Iberia04 

10th-century caliphs of Córdoba
915 births
976 deaths
Umayyad caliphs of Córdoba
10th-century Arabs
Medieval LGBT history
Medieval LGBT people
LGBT Muslims
LGBT royalty
LGBT heads of state